Saint Stephen the Great may refer to:

Stephen I of Hungary
Stephen III of Moldavia